Sergei Alekseyevich Ivanov (born 7 January 1997) is a Russian football player who plays for Alashkert in the Armenian Premier League.

Club career
He made his debut in the Russian Professional Football League for Zenit St. Petersburg 2 on 17 April 2015 in a game against Volga Tver. He made his Russian Football National League debut for Zenit-2 on 12 July 2015 in a game against Torpedo Armavir.

On 5 September 2016, he joined VSS Košice on loan.

He made his debut for the main squad of Zenit Saint Petersburg on 25 September 2019 in a Russian Cup game against Yenisey Krasnoyarsk.

On 6 February 2020, he joined Krylia Sovetov Samara on loan until the end of the 2019–20 season, with an option to buy. He left Krylia Sovetov on 1 June 2020.

On 24 July 2020, he joined Zemplín Michalovce on loan.

On 9 September 2022, Alashkert announced the signing of Ivanov.

Honours

Club
Zenit Saint Petersburg
 Russian Cup: 2019–20

References

External links
 
 

1997 births
Footballers from Saint Petersburg
Living people
Russian footballers
Russia youth international footballers
Russian expatriate footballers
Association football midfielders
FC Zenit Saint Petersburg players
FC Zenit-2 Saint Petersburg players
FC VSS Košice players
PFC Krylia Sovetov Samara players
MFK Zemplín Michalovce players
Russian First League players
Russian Second League players
2. Liga (Slovakia) players
Slovak Super Liga players
Expatriate footballers in Slovakia
Russian expatriate sportspeople in Slovakia